Alfred Seccombe (also credited as Alf Seccombe) (born December 8, 1982) is an American film director, actor, and film festival director. He grew up in Carmel Valley, California and started making films in high school with Conall Jones.

He was the Director of Programming for the Palo Alto International Film Festival in 2011 and 2012.

Short films 

Alf Seccombe's first notable film, Ringo, opened the inaugural Tiger Cub Competition at International Film Festival Rotterdam. His film Young Dracula came in second in the Bay Area Short category at the 54th San Francisco International Film Festival.

References

External links 
 SF360 Article
 Filmmaker Magazine Article 
 IndieWire Film Article
 IndieWire Palo Alto Int'l Film Festival Article
 Variety Palo Alto Int'l Film Festival Article

American film directors
American film producers
Film festival directors
1982 births
Living people
Film festival founders